Tả Phìn may refer to several places in Vietnam:

, a rural commune of Sa Pa
Tả Phìn, Điện Biên, a rural commune of Tủa Chùa District
, a rural commune of Đồng Văn District
, a rural commune of Sìn Hồ District